The Ramna Kali Mandir is a temple in Dhaka that was originally built in the time of the Mughal Empire. It was also known as the "Ramna Kalibari". The temple is dedicated to the Hindu Goddess Kali.

Location 
It is beside the former Dhaka Racecourse, now Suhrawardy Udyan. The entire temple complex occupies almost  and is on the south side of Ramna Park, opposite the Bangla Academy.

History 
The original temple was destroyed on March 27, 1971 by the Pakistani Army during the Bangladesh Liberation War. It was the site of a massacre of mostly Hindu people.

In Nepalese folklore, the Ramna Kali Temple was founded by the devotees of the Goddess Kali. The devotees had come to Bengal from the Himalayas.

Although the temple had stood for centuries, it was largely developed in the early 20th century. The temple was developed under the patronage of Rani Bilashmoni Debi, wife of Rajendra Narayan (18821913). At this time, the temple was one of Dhaka's tallest landmarks.

Design
The architectural design of the temple changed over the centuries in which it stood. In front of the temple was a large dighi (pool) which was a popular place for worshipers and visitors to swim. The temple has a tall shikhara (tower). Next to the temple was the Ma Anandamoyee Ashram, a place of worship with a residential complex and facilities for washing.

The design of the temple is documented in pictures taken at Sheikh Mujibur Rahman's address of 7 March 1971. This is likely the last time the temple was photographed by journalists or historians.

Demolition and genocide by the Pakistan Army
On March 25, 1971, in the night, the Pakistan Army launched "Operation Searchlight" in order to suppress a Bengali nationalist movement in what was then East Pakistan. The operation triggered a genocide and the Bangladesh Liberation War. Most of the targets of Operation Searchlight were young Hindu men, intellectuals, students and academics. Operation Searchlight focused on prominent Hindu sites including the Jagannath Hall (a hostel for Hindu students on the Dhaka University campus) and the Ramna Kali Mandir.

On March 27, 1971, the Pakistan Army entered the Ramna Kali Mandir complex and, within one hour, killed more then 1000 people. Several Muslims who had sought refuge in the temple complex were also killed.

Until 2000, accounts of the demolition of the temple relied largely on the oral testimony of survivors of and witnesses. In 2000, Awami League, the governing political party, opened a public enquiry. In September 2000, the chairman Justice KM Sobhan, presented a preliminary report.

Only around 50 victims of the massacre have been identified; relatives of the other victims are either deceased or have left Bangladesh. A worldwide appeal has been made for any surviving relatives of the Ramna Kali Mandir massacre victims to contribute names of their deceased family members to be listed on a future memorial.

Rebuilding
The Ma Durga Mandir and the Radha Krisna Mandir are present in the area of the Ramna Kali Mandir. Others are planned. The Government of India has pledged money for reconstruction efforts. Indian President, Ram Nath Kovind, visited the historic Ramna Kali temple in Dhaka during his visit to Bangladesh for the 50th Victory Day celebrations.

Completion and Inauguration

On December 17th 2021, Shri Ram Nath Kovind inaugurated the reconstructed Ramna Kali temple in Ramna, a part of the Bangladeshi capital Dhaka where the landmark Suhrawardy Udyan (the former Ramna Race Course) is located. The First Lady of India, Mrs. Kovind, and their daughter accompanied the President of India in the stated ceremony.

“The historic Ramna Kali temple is a symbol of the spiritual and cultural bonding among the people of India and Bangladesh.”, Mr. Kovind said at the ceremony.

After Bangladesh gained independence from Pakistan, a small temple was set up at the site for people to offer prayers. A reconstruction of the complex was announced in 2017, when then External Affairs Minister of India, the late Sushma Swaraj, inaugurated 15 development projects in Baridhara, Dhaka.

Gallery

References

External links

 News item on protests regarding attempt to shift temple location
 News item on rebuilding of temple
 Article on history and Commission report including details of the massacre and temple destruction on 27 March 1971

Kali temples
Hindu temples in Dhaka
Hindu temples in Dhaka Division
16th-century Hindu temples